Ajab Khan Afridi was an Afghan guerrilla fighter from Darra Adam Khel in the Frontier Tribal Areas, belonging to the Afridi tribe of Pashtuns. Following a raid on his house by a British Indian Army (BIA) detachment in 1923, Afridi declared it a personal affront to his honor and was ordered by his mother to take revenge on the BIA officers which had led the raid.

Afridi, along with four other villagers, attacked Kohat Cantonment. The wife of a British officer, Major Ellis, was stabbed and killed during the attack and they kidnapped Ellis' daughter, Molly.

Ajab Khan and his men also fought numerous skirmishes with British soldiers.

On 8 January 1961, Ajab Khan Afridi died at the age of 95 in Mazar-i-Sharif in the Balkh Province of the Kingdom of Afghanistan.

Legacy

Ajab Khan Afridi is hailed as a hero in the Khyber Pakhtunkhwa region, with 3 films made on him.

'Ajab Khan', was a 1961 Urdu language film based on the life of Ajab Khan Afridi and his battles against the British.

A statue of Ajab Khan Afridi was erected in 2018 at Abbas Chowk in his hometown, Darra Adam Khel in Khyber Pakhtunkhwa, Pakistani.

See also
 Rai Ahmad Khan Kharal
 Mai Bakhtawar
 Nizam Lohar
 Hemu Kalani
 Kadu Makrani
 Bhagat Singh

References 

Indian people of Pashtun descent
Pashtun people
Afridi people
1866 births
1961 deaths